Hemicosmorthoceras is an extinct genus of actively mobile carnivorous cephalopod, essentially a Nautiloid,  that lived in what would be present day  Europe during the Silurian to Devonian from 422.9—412.3 mya, existing for approximately .

Taxonomy
Hemicosmorthoceras was named by Foerste (1925). It was assigned to Orthocerida by Teichert et al. (1964); and to Endocerida by Sepkoski (2002).

Morphology
The shell is usually long, and may be straight ("orthoconic") or gently curved. In life, these animals may have been similar to the modern squid, except for the long shell.

Fossil distribution
Fossil distribution is exclusive to Sardinia, Austrian Alps.

References

Cephalopod genera
Silurian cephalopods
Devonian cephalopods
Ordovician first appearances
Devonian extinctions
Prehistoric animals of Europe